Richard S. Trethewey (born c. 1955 in Dedham, Massachusetts) is an American plumber and HVAC contractor, who is best known as a television personality, appearing regularly on This Old House and its spin-offs, Ask This Old House and Inside This Old House.

The Trethewey family has been part of This Old House since the very first season in 1979, when producer Russell Morash called on the Trethewey Brothers (Ron and John, Richard's father and uncle) to lend their expertise to his then new home improvement television series. Both Ron and John appear in the first season on camera. Richard took part on site when Ron refers to Richard and has him bring in a new boiler to show to Bob Vila (episode 4, 16:48 minutes). In the second season, Ron appears in an early episode to discuss the plans with Bob Vila but then passes on the work of installing the new equipment in the house to his son Richard who is seen frequently on camera. This makes Richard the second-longest recurring cast member on This Old House, behind Norm Abram.

Richard is a registered master plumber in the Commonwealth of Massachusetts. For each This Old House project, he oversees all plumbing, heating and air conditioning renovations. For Ask This Old House, he offers his expertise to viewers who write in with questions related to plumbing and HVAC, and occasionally visits a viewer's home.

In 1990, he left Trethewey Brothers to form his own company, RST, Inc. This eventually became RST Thermal. Located in Westwood, Massachusetts, the company serves much of New England and employs about nine people.

Richard and his wife Christine have two sons, Evan and Ross, who are in their father's business and have sometimes appeared on This Old House.

References

External links 
 

1956 births
Living people
American plumbers
American television personalities
Businesspeople from Dedham, Massachusetts
This Old House